Paulo Afonso da Rocha Junior (born 5 November 1997) is a Brazilian footballer also known as Juninho who plays as a forward.

References

External links
 
 
 
 
 
 
 
 

1997 births
Living people
Brazilian footballers
Association football midfielders
Cafetaleros de Chiapas footballers
Footballers from Rio de Janeiro (city)